King.com Limited, trading as King and also known as King Digital Entertainment, is a Maltese video game developer and publisher based in St. Julian's, Malta that specialises in social games. King gained prominence after releasing the cross-platform title Candy Crush Saga in 2012, considered one of the most financially successful games utilising the freemium model. King is led by Riccardo Zacconi, who has served in the role of chief executive officer since co-founding the company in 2003. Gerhard Florin took over Melvyn Morris's role as chairman in November 2014. As of 2017, King employs 2,000 people.

History

Founding 
Prior to founding King, Riccardo Zacconi and Toby Rowland, the latter of whom is the only son of British businessman Tiny Rowland, had worked together on uDate.com, a dating website created by Melvyn Morris which, by 2003, was the second-largest such site in the world. Morris opted to sell the site to the leading dating website Match.com (a subsidiary of IAC) for $150 million in 2003. Zacconi and Rowland joined with Thomas Hartwig, Sebastian Knutsson, Lars Markgren and Patrik Stymne, all of whom had worked previously with Zacconi at the failed dot-com web portal Spray, to create a new company with angel investment provided by Morris, who became the company's chairman. The company was initially based out of Stockholm, Sweden, and started with the development of browser-based video games. The site, Midasplayer.com, was then launched in August of that year.

Initially, Midasplayer.com was not profitable, and nearly went bankrupt until a cash infusion from Morris on Christmas Eve of 2003 helped to finance the company. By 2005, the company had been able to turn a profit. During this year, the company raised $43 million by selling a large stake to Apax Partners and Index Ventures. This investment was the last one that the company received before its initial public offering in 2014. Midasplayer.com was rebranded King.com in November 2005. King.com continued to develop games for its web portal, which it would also share to other web portals like Yahoo! Overall, King had developed about 200 games for their portal. By 2009, the company was making about $60 million annually. Rowland departed the company in 2008 to found Mangahigh, a web portal aimed for educational math games, and sold his stake back to the company for $3 million in 2011. Angel investor and former board member Klaus Hommels sold his similar stake at the same time.

Transition to social gaming 
Around 2009, social network games on Facebook began to gain popularity, led primarily through games developed by Zynga. King.com saw a significant drop in players on their portal games as a result, and started to develop their own Facebook-based games using the games already developed on the King.com portal, with their first such game released in 2010. King.com used their web portal as a testing grounds for new game ideas and determine which ones to bring to Facebook, as well as determining how to implement various microtransactions for tournament-style play into the Facebook games. Their first cross-platform web portal/Facebook game, Miner Speed, which allowed sharing of player information between platforms, was released in 2011, and was a simple match-3 tile game inspired by Bejeweled.

Following this model, in October 2011, the company released Bubble Witch Saga to both platforms. Bubble Witch Saga introduced the nature of a "saga" game: instead of playing the same gameboard for as long as the player could continue to match matches, the game offered individual levels that would challenge the player to complete certain goals in a limited number of turns. These saga elements allowed for the basics of social gameplay, but did not require the time investment that then-popular titles like Zynga's Farmville required; players could play just for a few minutes each day through the saga model. The formula proved extremely successful, and January 2012, Bubble Witch Saga had over 10 million players and was one of the most-played Facebook games. By April 2012, King.com had the second largest player count, around 30 million unique users, second only to Zynga on the Facebook platform. Facebook's director of games partnerships Sean Ryan described King.com's growth on the platform as "They were not a flash in the pan – they've been around seven years. But they came out of no where in an area that was unexpected." King.com next released Candy Crush Saga in April 2012, based on the popularity of its Candy Crush web-portal game and following the saga model from Bubble Witch Saga. The game attracted more than 4 million players within a few weeks.

The popularity of Bubble Witch Saga and Candy Crush Saga led King.com to start a new strategy into developing for the growing mobile game market, in a manner that would allow players to synchronise with the Facebook platform. Zacconi said that "As consumers and the industry focus more on games for mobile devices, launching a truly cross-platform Facebook game has been a top priority for King.com." A mobile version for iOS device of Bubble Witch Saga was released in July 2012, while the iOS mobile version of Candy Crush Saga was released in October 2012. Both games saw boosts in the number of unique players with the mobile introduction; King.com saw that previously-declining player counts for Bubble Witch Saga become steady with the mobile version's release, while Candy Crush Saga saw more than 5.2 million unique players on Facebook in November 2012 and which were continuing to climb. Additionally, in-game advertising, which factored into about 15% of King.com's revenues, had increased ten-fold from 2011 into 2012. Users jumped to 408 million by the end of 2013. Revenues for King.com increased from a little over $62 million in 2011 to $1.88 billion in 2013.

In March 2013, on the ten-year anniversary of its founding, the company announced it was dropping the ".com" part of its branding and would continue on as just "King".

Initial public offering 
In mid-2013, King.com had considered filing an initial public offering (IPO) in the United States. Zacconi had said that "The IPO is an option...We are building the company and part of that is investigating options." The company applied for IPO in September 2013. Its filing was made using allowances in the Jumpstart Our Business Startups Act to keep details of the IPO secret until it was to be offered. The IPO was backed by Bank of America, Merrill Lynch, Credit Suisse Group AG and JPMorgan Chase & Co. The IPO gained great interest, as it followed Zynga's $1 billion IPO in 2011 and Twitter's IPO earlier in the month.

King completed its IPO on 26 March 2014. Priced at $22.50 a share, the middle of its projected price range, the IPO valued the company at US$7.08 billion. About $500 million was raised through the sale of 22.2 million shares. Of that, 15.3 million shares came from the company and the rest from Apax and other stakeholders. It was the largest ever IPO for a mobile/social gaming company in the US, eclipsing Zynga's 2011 offering. To celebrate the debut, Candy Crush mascots took to the New York Stock Exchange. Morris was the company's largest shareholder with approximately 35.6 million shares valued at $821 million. The company began trading under the "KING" symbol on the New York Stock Exchange.

Shares of King fell 15.6% on the first day of trading, closing at $19. By June, the company's valuation had dropped by $2 billion, though otherwise was still profitable. Zacconi noted that their strategy from this point was not to find another "mega-hit" like Candy Crush Saga, but to "build a portfolio of games", carrying King's game design approach to other genres. Revenue following the IPO were over $2.6 billion in 2014, with Candy Crush Saga generating nearly half of that amount.

King acquired Seattle-based mobile studio Z2Live in February 2015.

Acquisition by Activision Blizzard 
In November 2015, Activision Blizzard announced its plans to acquire King for $5.9 billion. Upon announcement of the news, USA Today reported that the deal "gives Activision immediate access to the growing mobile gaming audience, the fastest-rising sector in video games". On 23 February 2016, Activision Blizzard closed its acquisition of King for a deal of $5.9 billion. Activision Blizzard as a result operates the world's largest game network, reaching around 500 million users in 196 countries. About the King acquisition, the CEO of Activision Blizzard explained that "we see great opportunities to create new ways for audiences to experience their favorite franchises, from Candy Crush to World of Warcraft to Call of Duty and more, across mobile devices, consoles and personal computers."

In January 2019, Humam Sakhnini was installed as president of King, reporting directly to Zacconi. As part of a large workforce reduction announced in February 2019 across the whole of Activision Blizzard, King's Z2Live studio in Seattle was shuttered. Zacconi stepped down as CEO on 1 July 2019, remaining as chairman until August 2020, when he left the company entirely. Tjodolf Sommestad, the former chief development officer, replaced Sakhnini in February 2022.

King's games portal site King.com had been rebranded to Royalgames.com, through which they offered paid-entry tournaments for a chance at cash prizes up until 2019, after which this feature was disabled for new accounts. During the first half of 2021, King had been forced to hold back on payout withdrawals by users over an investigation launched by PayPal over these withdrawals, eventually unfreezing accounts by June 2021 once the investigation was complete. King announced in October 2021 that the portal would be shuttered in December 2021 in a phased removal of the available games. Players that still had funds available on the site would be able to continue to withdraw these funds for some indefinite time after games from the site had been removed.

In June 2022, King acquired the Swedish AI company Peltarion.

Revenue model 
King's games, prior to June 2013, made revenue for the company through a combination of in-game advertising and microtransactions. These microtransactions allow for players to use funds to purchase in-game booster items that could be used to help clear certain levels, additional lives, and immediate access to new levels instead of having to wait for a few days.

In June 2013, the company opted to remove all in-game advertising from their games, relying solely on microtransactions. The company stated that due to their "focus around delivering an uninterrupted entertainment experience for our network of loyal players across web, tablet and mobile has unfortunately led to the difficult decision of removing advertising as a core element of King's overall strategy". Advertising revenue had only made up 10% of the company's earnings in 2012, and only 1% within 2013; the company in its IPO files stated they do not anticipate any further earnings from advertising revenue. While King relies heavily on in-game purchases, it is estimated that only single-digit percentages of all players of their games have spent money on their titles. In Q4 2014, King had 356 million monthly unique users, with 8.3 million of them spending money. The 2.3% that pay spent an average of $23.42 a month within the games. King stated that their model is aimed to continue to draw existing and new players to all of their games: "If the cost to acquire players is greater than the revenue we generate over time from those players and if we cannot successfully migrate our current players to new games and new platforms as we have historically done so, our business and operating results will be harmed".

Games 
King games offer asynchronous play, enabling users to connect to their Facebook account whilst playing on their smartphone or tablet device. This means that the user's progress is updated across all platforms, allowing the player to switch from smartphone, to tablet, to Facebook without losing their progress in the game.

Bubble Witch Saga was King's first mobile game, released in July 2012 after its launch on Facebook in September 2011. Papa Pear Saga was released in March 2013 on Facebook, it is a Peggle variation.

Around 2012, Pyramid Solitaire Saga was soft launched on Facebook. It was released on mobile in May 2014. In late 2012 Pet Rescue Saga was launched on Facebook, then on iOS and Android In June 2013, Candy Crush Soda Saga was soft launched on Facebook and mobile and Bubble Witch 2 Saga was widely released for Android and iOS devices. In November 2014, Candy Crush Soda Saga was widely released on Android and iOS. Alpha Betty Saga launched on Facebook in April 2015. This game is a variation of Bookworm.

In 2013, King acquired the Defold game engine, developed by Ragnar Svensson and Christian Murray in 2007 as a lightweight 2D game engine. The two had offered the engine to King as well as their services as contractors to support it, and later bought the engine, using it first for the game Blossom Blast Saga. In March 2016, King released the Defold engine as a free development tool for any user, and by May 2020, it ceded control of the engine to the Defold Foundation, which made the engine open source with plans to continue to support it with additional investment from King.

King announced in April 2017 that they will be developing a mobile Call of Duty game, a property owned by Activision; the game would be one of the first ones outside of the casual mobile space for the company.

King's most popular game is Candy Crush Saga, which was launched on King's website in March 2011, which is a tile-matching game. It launched on Facebook in April 2012 and quickly gained popularity. Following its success on Facebook, King launched Candy Crush Saga on mobile (iOS and Android) in November 2012. The game was downloaded over 10 million times in its first month. In January 2013, it became the number one most played game on Facebook. It had over 45 million monthly users in March 2013. By January 2014, it had over 150 million monthly users.

While King continues to release other titles, the company's principle focus as of November 2017 are on its four most popular series: Candy Crush Saga, Bubble Witch Saga, Pet Rescue Saga, and Farm Heroes Saga.

Controversies

Trademark dispute 
In January 2014, King attracted controversy after attempting to trademark the words "Candy" and "Saga" in game titles. This directly impacted Stoic's trademark request for The Banner Saga, to which King filed an opposition, calling the name "deceptively similar" to King games. Stoic said that the dispute hindered work on a planned sequel to their game. On 17 April 2014, it was reported that King has settled its disputes with Stoic Studio and Runsome Apps.

Cloning dispute 
Also in January 2014, game developer Matthew Cox accused King of ripping off his game Scamperghost, saying King's Pac-Avoid was a clone of it. According to Cox, he was in talks with King about licensing Scamperghost, but when the deal fell through the company released the game Pac-Avoid. Cox said Epicshadows, the developer of Pac-Avoid, told him that King had approached them to "clone the game very quickly". King removed the game from its website, but denied the cloning allegation, stating that they were removing the game "for the avoidance of doubt".

References

External links 
 

2003 establishments in Sweden
2014 initial public offerings
2016 mergers and acquisitions
Activision Blizzard
Browser-based game websites
Companies formerly listed on the New York Stock Exchange
Mobile game companies
St. Julian's, Malta
Video game companies established in 2003
Video game companies of Malta
Video game development companies
Video game publishers